Ethmia calumniella is a moth in the family Depressariidae. It is found in Brazil.

The ground color of the forewings is white, with blackish brown markings. The ground color of the hindwings is subhyaline (not quite glassy) whitish, but dark brown at the distal margin and along the veins approaching the terminal margin.

References

Moths described in 1973
calumniella